DePoe is a surname. Notable people with the surname include:

Brian DePoe, Canadian radio personality and program director
David DePoe (born 1944), Canadian community activist and retired teacher
Norman DePoe (1917-1980), Canadian journalist
Peter DePoe (born 1943), American rock musician